Ophidian may refer to:
Ophidian, a reptile of the suborder  Ophidia (or  Serpentes); a snake
Ophidian (wrestler), a professional wrestler
Ophidian (Dungeons & Dragons), a Dungeons & Dragons monster
Ophidian 2350, a collectible card game
Ophidian, a fictional hotel from the American TV show Supernatural